Mary Quintard Govan Steele (May 8, 1922 – July 6, 1992) was an American author and naturalist. She wrote over twenty books, mainly for children. One of them, Journey Outside, was a Newbery Honor Book. Steele sometimes wrote under the names Wilson Gage and J. N. Darby.

Biography

Early life
Mary Quintard Govan Steele was born on May 8, 1922, in Chattanooga, Tennessee, to Gilbert and Christine N. Govan. She graduated from the University of Chattanooga.

Career
Steele wrote in The Living Year, "I did not become a writer, but was born one, waking up in the morning to sort the day into scenes and characters and descriptions." One of her few books for adults, The Living Year: An Almanac for My Survivors (Viking, 1972) features Tennessee natural history.

Her first book, The Secret of the Indian Mound, was published in 1958 under the pseudonym Wilson Gage. The Secret of the Fiery Gorge (1960) was her "first work of some interest in the field of the fantastic", according to John Clute. Journey Outside (1969) is science fiction for young adults. Its protagonists "live Underground in Pocket Universe environment" (capitals indicate encyclopedia cross-references).

The Mrs. Gaddy books by Wilson Gage are "fantasies for younger readers". WorldCat libraries report Mathilde and Matilde titles by Mary Q. Steele, in French and Spanish translation.

Personal life
She was married to author William O. Steele.

Death
She died on July 6, 1992 in Chapel Hill, North Carolina.

Selected works
 The Secret of the Indian Mound, written as by Wilson Gage, illustrated by Mary Stevens (Cleveland, New York: World Publishing, 1958)
 The Secret of Crossbone Hill, as Gage (1959)
 The Secret of the Fiery Gorge, as Gage (1960)
 Miss Osborne-the-Mop, as Gage (1963)
 Journey Outside, illus. Rocco Negri (1969) – Newbery Medal finalist
 The Living Year: An Almanac for My Survivors (1972), natural history
 The First of the Penguins (1973), science fantasy
 Squash Pie, as Gage (1976)
 Mrs. Gaddy and the Ghost, as Gage (1979)
 Cully Cully and the Bear, as Gage, illus. James Stevenson (1983)
 Anna's Summer Songs, illus. Lena Anderson (1988), poetry
 Anna's Garden Songs, illus. Anderson (1989), poetry

References

 "Mary Govan Steele Dies; Noted Author, Naturalist", The Chattanooga Times, July 6, 1992

Papers
 Mary Q. Steele collection, 1922–1992. 0.5 linear feet University of Tennessee at Chattanooga.
 Gage Wilson Papers 1976. Collection contains correspondence for Squash Pie. University of Minnesota, Minneapolis. 1 folder.
 Steele, Mary Q. Papers, 1969–1979. University of Minnesota – Twin Cities. c 1.9 linear ft.
 Steele, Mary Q. Mary Quintard Steele collection, undated. Chattanooga-Hamilton County Bicentennial Library 0.3 linear ft. Manuscript and galley proofs of "Living Year" and "First of the Penguins".

External links

 
 
 

1922 births
1992 deaths
20th-century American novelists
American children's writers
American women novelists
Pseudonymous women writers
Newbery Honor winners
People from Chattanooga, Tennessee
University of Tennessee at Chattanooga alumni
Novelists from Tennessee
American women children's writers
20th-century American women writers
American naturalists
Women naturalists
20th-century naturalists
20th-century pseudonymous writers